Central China is a geographical and a loosely defined cultural region that includes the provinces of Henan, Hubei and Hunan. Jiangxi is sometimes also regarded to be part of this region. Central China is now officially part of South Central China governed by the People's Republic of China. In the context of the Rise of Central China Plan by the State Council of the People's Republic of China in 2004, surrounding provinces including Shanxi, Anhui, are also defined as regions of Central China development zones.

Administrative divisions

Cities with urban area over one million in population 
Provincial capitals in bold.

See also 

 Regions of China
 East China and Western China
 Northern and southern China
 South Central China
Northeast China, Northwest China and South west China
  China proper

Notes

References

Citations

Sources 

 http://www.people.fas.harvard.edu/~chgis/work/design/chinastdb_1210.doc

 
Regions of China